Psittacanthus acinarius is a species of  mistletoe in the family Loranthaceae, which is native to
Bolivia, Brazil, Colombia, Costa Rica, Ecuador, Peru, Venezuela, and French Guiana.

Description
Psittacanthus acinarius has pendulous branches, which are circular in cross-section, except at the apex where the cross-section is slightly quadrangular. There are no epicortical roots. The petiolate, leathery leaves are opposite and of length 10–22 cm and width 6–15 cm, with the leaf base being acute or obtuse, the apex obtuse, rounded, with inconspicuous ribbing.  The position of the inflorescence is terminal and has persistent non-fused bracts,  with an umbel of pedunculate triads. The external colour of the petals is greenish; the internal colour is red and they have a straight style. The buds are long and straight with a dilated base and an acute apex.
The stamens are dimorphic. The anthers  are red and 7–8 mm in length. The stigma is globose and  red. The fruit is ellipsoidal or ovoid, of length 20 mm, width 10 mm long, and when immature is reddish, and when ripe black. The seed has 4-6 cotyledons.

The terminal position of the inflorescences, the robust and fleshy aspect of the peduncles and flowers, the presence of the dilated sub-floral dome, and the greenish color of the flowers are distinctive characteristics of the species. It presents great variability in leaf format. In Brazil, it is one of the most common mistletoe species.

Distribution
It is found in 
Bolivia, Brazil, Colombia, Costa Rica, Ecuador, Peru, Venezuela, and French Guiana.

In Brazil, it is found in the Amazon Rainforest, Caatinga, Central Brazilian Savanna, and the Pantanal, inhabiting the vegetation types of 
Caatinga, Amazonian Campinarana, Cerrado, riverine forest and/or gallery forest, Igapó flooded forest, Terra Firme Forest, Várzea inundated forest), seasonally semideciduous forest, and the Amazonian Savanna.

Taxonomy
Psittacanthus acinarius was first described by von Martius in 1829 as Loranthus acinarius, and in 1830, he reassigned it to his newly described genus Psittacanthus.

Etymology
Psittacanthos comes from the Greek psittakos (parrot), and the Greek anthos (flower), possibly chosen, according to Don, because of the bright colours.  The specific epithet, acinarius,  is the Latin for designed for holding grapes.

References

External links
von Martius, C.F.P. 1867. Flora Brasiliensis 5(2) p.41, Tab 9.

acinarius
Flora of Brazil
Flora of Bolivia
Flora of Colombia
Flora of Costa Rica
Flora of Ecuador
Flora of Peru
Flora of Venezuela
Flora of French Guiana
Taxa named by Carl Friedrich Philipp von Martius